Badal Rashid (1929–1993) was a Awami League politician and the former Member of Parliament for Kushtia-6.

Career
Rashid was elected to parliament from Kushtia-6 as an Awami League candidate in 1973. He was a veteran of the Bangladesh Liberation war. He was an advocate.

References

Awami League politicians
1929 births
1993 deaths
1st Jatiya Sangsad members